Vipolže is a scattered village in the lower Municipality of Brda in the Littoral region of Slovenia on the border with Italy.

The parish church in the settlement is dedicated to Saint Giles and belongs to the Koper Diocese.

Vipolže Castle
The 11th-century castle was converted into a Venetian-style villa in the 17th century. It was damaged in a fire on 10 November 1948 allegedly set by members of a counter-revolutionary group known as the Slovenian Army of the Royal Yugoslav Armed Forces or the Matjaž Army, dedicated to destroying state-owned property. The fire destroyed the roof of the castle and 40,000 kg of hay stored inside it. The alleged ringleader Darko Toroš and his accomplices were arrested along with eight uninvolved persons; Toroš was shot and buried in an unknown location, and the others were sentenced to lengthy prison terms with hard labor.

References

External links
Vipolže on Geopedia

Populated places in the Municipality of Brda